Arachnoididae is a family of echinoderms of the order Clypeasteroida.

Genera
 Ammotrophus H. L. Clark, 1928
 Arachnoides Leske, 1778
 Fellaster Durham, 1955
 Fossulaster Lambert & Thiery, 1925
 Monostychia Laube, 1869
 Philipaster Wang, 1994
 Prowillungaster Wang, 1994
 Scutellinoides Durham, 1955
 Willungaster Philip & Foster, 1971

References

 Natural History Museum

Clypeasteroida